Fenia Chang is a Taiwanese pianist who has played at various venues in North America, Europe and Asia, with her first national recital at age 11 broadcast on television in Taiwan. She has also been on the faculty of several schools of music including Texas A & M. She maintains her own website, and appears in concerts regularly such as at the Dame Myra Hess concerts given in Chicago weekly and inspired by those given by Dame Myra Hess in London during World War II.

Early life
Fenia began piano study at the age of 9 and made her solo debut at the age of 11, after winning the first Japan Kawai Piano Competition.

References

External links
 Fenia Chang at www.classicalconnect.com
 Fenia Chang Official Site

Taiwanese pianists
Living people
21st-century pianists
Year of birth missing (living people)
Women classical pianists